The Hawthorn Group is a stratigraphic unit that includes several geologic formations of Late Oligocene to Pliocene age in North Florida, United States. It is known for its phosphate rock resources, and for its rich assemblages of Neogene vertebrate fossils. It was originally called the Waldo Formation by L.C. Johnson of the United States Geological Survey in 1887, and later became the Hawthorne Group named for Hawthorne, Florida, where its phosphate-rich rock was quarried and processed for use as fertilizer.

Age
Period: Neogene
Epoch: Miocene
Faunal stage: Chattian through early Blancan ~28.4 to ~2.588 mya, a period of

Location
The Hawthorn Group extends from Suwannee County in the north and southward to Hernando County. It encompasses in part the counties of Gilchrist, Levy, Dixie, Citrus, Sumter, Alachua and Marion County. The Hawthorn is also present below undifferentiated sediments (TQu) as well as the Tamiami Formation from Polk County south through Highlands, Glades, Hendry, Dade, Collier, and Monroe County at depths ranging from mean sea level near Polk to below 600 meters in Monroe Co. The Hawthorn overlies Ocala Limestone

Sub-units
Arcadia Formation
Coosawhatchie Formation (Miocene-Pliocene)
Peace River Formation (Miocene-Pliocene)
Statenville Formation (Miocene)
Torreya Formation (Miocene)

Paleofauna
Reptiles
Apalone ferox (Florida Softshell Turtle)
Pseudemys caelata (Pond Turtle)
Terrapene (Box Turtle)
Deirochelys (Chicken Turtle)
Geochelone (Tortoise)
Alligator mississippiensis (American Alligator)
†Gavialosuchus americanus or Thecachampsa antiqua (American Crocodile)
Typhlops (Blind snake)
Xenodontinae (Mud Snake)
Heterodon (Hognose Snake)
Elaphe (Rat Snake)
Lampropeltis getulus (Kingsnake)
Nerodia (Water snake)
Thamnophis (Garter Snake) 	
Crotalinae (Lancehead, Rattlesnake)
Sistrurus (Rattlesnake)
Birds
Anserinae (Swan)
Podicipedidae (Grebe)
Phalacrocoracidae (Cormorant)
Anhinga grandis (Snakebird)
Ciconiidae (Stork)
Phoenicopteridae (Flamingo)
Ardea (Heron)
Egretta (Egret)
Ardeola (Heron)
Aramidae (Limpkin)
Gruidae (Crane-like)
Rallidae (Crakes & Coots)
Cathartidae (New World Vulture)
Pandionidae (Osprey)
Accipitridae (Eagle)
Passeriformes (Songbird)
Mammals
†Metaxytherium floridanum (Sea Cow)
†Gomphotherium (Elephant)
†Tapirus simpsoni (Tapir)
†Teleoceras proterum (Rhinoceros)
†Aphelops malacorhinus (Rhinoceros)
†Pseudhipparion skinneri (Horse)
†Hipparion tehonense (Horse)
†Neohipparion trampasense (Horse)
†Nannippus westoni (Horse)
†Hippotherium ingenuum and H. plicatile (Horse)
†Calippus cerasinus and C. elachistus (Horse)
†Protohippus gidleyi (Horse)
Microchiroptera (Microbat)
†Leptarctus (Mustelidae)
†Hoplictis (Mustelidae)
†Plionictis (Mustelidae)
†Sthenictis lacota (Mustelidae)
†Arctonasua floridana (Raccoon)
†Paranasua biradica
†Leptocyon
†Epicyon haydeni and E. saevus (Proto-dog)
†Nimravides galiani (False Saber-tooth cat)
†Barbourofelis loveorum (False Saber-tooth cat)
†Antilocaprinae (Antilope)
†Pseudoceras (Early horse-type ungulate)
†Yumaceras hamiltoni (Camel-like)
†Cetacea (Whale)
†Aepycamelus major (Camel)
†Procamelus grandis (Camel)
†Hemiauchenia minima (Camel)
Talpidae (Mole)
Soricidae (Shrew)
†Archaeolaginae (Rabbit)Sciuridae (Squirrel)
†Eucastor planus (Beaver)Abelmoschomys simpsoni (Vole)
†Mylagaulus elassos'' (Horned gopher)

References

USGS: Florida Geology
Paleobiology database: Love Bone Bed Collection

Geologic groups of Florida
Neogene Florida
Paleogene Florida
Oligocene Series of North America
Miocene Series of North America
Paleontology in Florida
Miocene United States